Herdt is a surname. Notable people with the surname include:

Gilbert Herdt (born 1949), American anthropologist
James L. Herdt (born 1947), United States Navy officer
Stefan Herdt (born 1915), German politician
Waldemar Herdt (born 1962), German politician

See also
Gerdt